James Scott Hunter (born November 19, 1947) is a former professional football player, a quarterback in the National Football League (NFL) for eight seasons in the 1970s. He played for the Green Bay Packers, Buffalo Bills, Atlanta Falcons, and Detroit Lions.

Early years
Born in Mobile, Alabama, Hunter graduated from Vigor High School in Prichard. After his senior season, Hunter was named AAAA All-Alabama by the Associated Press. He committed to Alabama on December 4, 1965.

College career
As NCAA rules prohibited freshmen from playing on varsity football teams at the time, Hunter played on the freshman-only Crimson Tide in 1966. He took a redshirt season in 1967, but became the starter in 1968. In 1969, Alabama hosted the Ole Miss Rebels in a nationally televised game on October 4 in prime time for ABC. In a race of offenses, Hunter outgunned Rebel quarterback Archie Manning in a 33-32 win. At the end of his senior year in 1970, Hunter caught a go-ahead touchdown in the 1970 Astro-Bluebonnet Bowl en route to a tie with Oklahoma.

Professional career

Green Bay Packers
Hunter was selected in the sixth round of the 1971 NFL Draft by the Green Bay Packers, the 140th overall pick. He started ten games when starting quarterback Bart Starr was injured. Hunter started the entire 1972 season and led the Packers to their first division title and playoff appearance since 1967 under the tutelage of Starr, who served that season as quarterbacks coach. In 1973, Hunter played only a fraction of the time, embroiled in a quarterback competition with Jerry Tagge and Jim Del Gaizo.

Buffalo Bills
After signing a multi-year deal with the Packers in May 1974, Hunter was traded in July to the Buffalo Bills after participating in the 1974 NFL strike. The Bills sent Pete Van Valkenberg and Steve Okoniewski to the Packers in the trade. Playing as backup to Joe Ferguson, Hunter made only one appearance all year, helping the team to a win against the Atlanta Falcons on October 16. He was waived during the 1975 training camp and did not play in the NFL that season, instead running unsuccessfully for local government in Mobile.

Atlanta Falcons
Hunter landed with the Atlanta Falcons in 1976, starting the season on the bench and gaining playing time as the season went on. Hunter started seven games in 1977, until starter Steve Bartkowski returned from knee surgery and took over as the full-time starter. Hunter was released after the season, and did not play in the NFL in 1978.

Detroit Lions
Hunter's last season in the NFL was 1979 with the Detroit Lions, where he backed up Jeff Komlo but still saw some action when the rookie struggled and occasionally challenged for the starting job.

After football
Hunter returned to Alabama and worked as a sportscaster in Mobile for nearly two decades. He worked for WKRG-TV, the CBS affiliate, and then for WPMI-TV, the NBC affiliate. He then worked as an investment broker. 

He also co-hosts a seasonal radio show on WNSP 105.5 FM called "Talkin' Football" (pronounced Tawlkin-Football) with former Auburn lineman, Tracy Turner and legendary WNSP personality, Dave Schultz. Scott remains great friends with Archie Manning to this day and the two have extracontinental text conversations when Archie is in Europe. Hunter is known for "dropping it in the bucket" and being one of five Alabama quarterbacks (Blake Sims, Tua Tagovailoa, Mac Jones, and Bryce Young) to throw for 400 yards in a game. Hunter is famous for "Keeping It Between the Lines" and not allowing coaching hot seat talk or "who danced with who on Saturday night" to derail conversations.

Prior to its closure, "Talkin' Football" was frequently hosted from John Word's Captain's Table, which was in the shadow of the USS Alabama. Hunter would often say that their steaks were "so big that they hang off your plate". 

Hunter is also a commercial pilot with over 4,000 flying hours. He flies a Cessna 182.

Hunter was inducted in the Alabama Sports Hall of Fame in 1998. He is married with three children, and resided in Daphne, Alabama in the late 2000s. He had previously lived in De Pere, Wisconsin when he played with the Packers.

See also
 Alabama Crimson Tide football yearly statistical leaders

References

External links
 
 Raymond James profile

1947 births
Living people
American football quarterbacks
Alabama Crimson Tide football players
Atlanta Falcons players
Buffalo Bills players
Detroit Lions players
Green Bay Packers players
Vigor High School alumni
Sportspeople from Mobile, Alabama
Players of American football from Alabama
People from Daphne, Alabama
People from De Pere, Wisconsin